Violeta del Pilar Lagunes Viveros (born 12 October 1971) is a Mexican politician. As of 2014 she served as Deputy of the LX Legislature of the Mexican Congress representing Puebla.

References

1971 births
Living people
Politicians from Puebla
Women members of the Chamber of Deputies (Mexico)
21st-century Mexican politicians
21st-century Mexican women politicians
Deputies of the LX Legislature of Mexico
Members of the Chamber of Deputies (Mexico) for Puebla